Musters is a surname. People with the surname include:

 George Chaworth Musters (1841–1879), British Royal Navy commander and traveller
 Marcel Musters (born 1959), Dutch actor
 Pauline Musters (1878–1895), the shortest woman ever recorded
 William Musters (1810–1870), English cricketer

See also
 Muster (disambiguation)